Dreamland 2021 is the third studio album by American electronic music producer Zhu, released on April 30, 2021 via the label Astralwerks. The album features vocals from Yuna, Arctic Lake, Tinashe, Channel Tres, partywithray and Kota the Friend.

Chart performance
The album debuted at number 11 on the Billboard Top Dance/Electronic Albums chart. The single "Sky is Crying (feat. Yuna)" peaked at No. 39 on the US dance chart.

Track listing

Charts

References

2021 albums
Zhu (musician) albums